Bartomeu "Tomeu" Nadal Mesquida (born 8 February 1989) is a Spanish professional footballer who plays as a goalkeeper for Real Oviedo.

Club career
Born in Manacor, Balearic Islands, Nadal was a product of RCD Mallorca's youth system. He made his debut as a senior with the B team in 2008, spending several seasons with them in Tercera División and Segunda División B. He was also third choice for the main squad in La Liga, behind Dudu Aouate and Miguel Ángel Moyá.

On 28 June 2011, Nadal signed a two-year deal with Getafe CF, being assigned to the reserves in the third division. On 13 July 2013, he joined fellow league club Gimnàstic de Tarragona.

A backup to Manolo Reina, Nadal appeared sparingly during the 2013–14 season. On 21 February 2014, he was suspended until June after being irregularly lined up in a 2–0 home win against CD Atlético Baleares (which Nàstic subsequently lost 3–0 after a court decision). 

Nadal agreed to a new two-year contract with the Catalans on 8 July 2014, but continued to play understudy to Reina during the campaign. On 9 September 2015, he made his professional debut by starting in a 2–2 home draw against Girona FC in the second round of the Copa del Rey, also saving one penalty in the 5–4 shootout win.

On 27 January 2016, Nadal cut ties with Gimnàstic. On 19 February, he returned to his previous club Mallorca until 30 June.

On 4 July 2016, Nadal signed for Albacete Balompié, recently relegated to division three. He was an undisputed starter during the campaign, contributing 43 appearances – play-offs included – as his side returned to the second tier at the first attempt.

Nadal made his professional league debut on 20 August 2017 at the age of 28 years and six months, keeping a clean sheet in a 0–0 away draw with Granada CF. On 29 October 2018, he agreed to an extension at the Estadio Carlos Belmonte until June 2021.

On 5 August 2021, free agent Nadal signed a two-year contract with Real Oviedo also in the second division.

References

External links

1989 births
Living people
Sportspeople from Manacor
Spanish footballers
Footballers from Mallorca
Association football goalkeepers
Segunda División players
Segunda División B players
Tercera División players
RCD Mallorca B players
Getafe CF B players
Gimnàstic de Tarragona footballers
RCD Mallorca players
Albacete Balompié players
Real Oviedo players
Competitors at the 2009 Mediterranean Games
Mediterranean Games medalists in football
Mediterranean Games gold medalists for Spain